David Eastwood (30 March 1848 – 17 May 1903) was an English first-class cricketer, who played twenty nine matches for Yorkshire County Cricket Club between 1870 and 1877.

Born in Lascelles Hall, Huddersfield, Yorkshire, England, Eastwood was a right slow round arm bowler who took twenty catches and  scored 807 first-class runs, with a top score of 68, at an average of 13.22.  His bowling netted 36 wickets at an average of 19.83, with best figures of 6 for 69. His first-class career lasted from 1870 to 1879.

Eastwood died in May 1903, in Sheepridge, Huddersfield, Yorkshire, aged 55.

References

1848 births
1903 deaths
Yorkshire cricketers
Cricketers from Huddersfield
English cricketers
Players cricketers
North v South cricketers
United North of England Eleven cricketers
London United Eleven cricketers
English cricketers of 1864 to 1889